Bellport High School is the public high school for the South Country Central School District, which is located in Suffolk County, Long Island in the United States.  It serves students in grades 9-12 in Bellport, East Patchogue, Brookhaven Hamlet and parts of Medford and North Bellport.  The principal is Erika Della Rosa. It is preceded by Bellport Middle School.

Academics 

According to 2007 data, 75.8% of Bellport graduates earn a New York State Regent's diploma.  51.6% of graduates plan to attend 4 year college, and 33.2% plan to attend a 2-year college, usually Suffolk County Community College.

Advanced Placement courses are offered in European History, U.S. History, U.S. Government and Politics, English Language and Composition, English Literature and Composition, Calculus, Statistics, Art, Art History, Music Theory, Chemistry, Physics, Biology and Environmental Science.

Sports 

State titles were won in Boys Basketball in 1980, Boys Football in 1982 and 2001, and Boys Cross Country in 1964.  The school offers a wide range of both Junior Varsity and Varsity sports.

The Girls Volleyball team clinched their first Class "A" Championship during the 2010 season, making their first ever trip to States where they lost in the first round.

The Wrestling team had huge success in the late 1990s winning the League Dual Meet Titles in 1997 and 1998, as well as winning the League Tournament Title in 1997.

The Boys Cross Country Team won League Titles in 1992, led by James Fuoco and James Arnold, 1996, 1998, 2000, 2001, 2002, 2003, 2004, and 2011.  In 1998, they won their first Division title in school history.  A Division title was also won in 2006. 

The Boys Track team won League Titles in 1990, 1991, 1992, and 1993.

The Dance Team has brought home second place from NDA Nationals in Orlando Florida two years in a row, 2013 and 2014.

References 

Public high schools in New York (state)
Schools in Suffolk County, New York